Lassana Coulibaly (born 10 April 1996) is a Malian professional footballer who plays as a midfielder for Serie A club Salernitana and the Mali national team.

Club career
Coulibaly is a youth product from Bastia. He made his Ligue 1 debut on 8 August 2015 against Rennes. He replaced François Kamano during stoppage time in a 2–1 home win. Two weeks later, he scored his first league goal against Guingamp.

On 10 July 2018, Coulibaly joined Scottish Premiership side Rangers on a season-long loan from Angers.

International career
Coulibaly was called up to the Mali U20 national team for the 2016 Toulon Tournament, and made his debut in a 1–0 loss to the Czech Republic U20s. He made his debut for the senior Mali national team in a 5–2 2017 Africa Cup of Nations qualification win over Benin on 4 September 2016.

Career statistics

International

References

External links
 

1996 births
Living people
Association football midfielders
Malian footballers
Mali international footballers
Mali under-20 international footballers
2017 Africa Cup of Nations players
2019 Africa Cup of Nations players
2021 Africa Cup of Nations players
Ligue 1 players
Scottish Professional Football League players
Belgian Pro League players
Serie A players
SC Bastia players
Angers SCO players
Rangers F.C. players
Cercle Brugge K.S.V. players
U.S. Salernitana 1919 players
Malian expatriate footballers
Malian expatriate sportspeople in France
Expatriate footballers in France
Malian expatriate sportspeople in Belgium
Expatriate footballers in Belgium
Malian expatriate sportspeople in Italy
Expatriate footballers in Italy
21st-century Malian people